Svetozar Glushkov (born 23 November 1939) is a Russian equestrian. He competed in two events at the 1968 Summer Olympics.

References

External links
 

1939 births
Living people
Russian male equestrians
Soviet male equestrians
Olympic equestrians of the Soviet Union
Equestrians at the 1968 Summer Olympics
People from Slavgorod
Sportspeople from Altai Krai